Kala Keerthi Jayantha Chandrasiri (ජයන්ත චන්ද්‍රසිරි; born 1959), is a Sri Lankan journalist, screenplay writer, television director, and filmmaker in Sri Lankan cinema. Chandrasiri's film Agnidahaya won seven golden awards and four silver awards at the Signis International Film Festival 2003. His two teledramas Dandubasnamanaya and Akala Sandhya are rated as two of Seven Iconic Teledramas In Sri Lanka's Television History.

Career
Chandrasiri started his acting career in 1978 under the guidance of German dramatist Dr. Norbet J. Mayer. He completed extensive study on theater by earning scholarships to Norway, Sweden, Germany and the USA. In 1979 he worked as the playwright for the play Saraswathi. Armed with the knowledge gained through these scholarships, he returned home and began directing with stage drama Ath, which led to State Drama Award winners Mora and Oththukaraya. In 2016 he resigned from the post of executive editor of the Divaina newspaper due to political disputes.

He has acted in two films, Sagarayak Meda and Maatha. His maiden stage drama direction came through Hankithi Daha Thuna. His maiden television drama direction came through super hit Weda Hamine. His maiden cinematic direction was Agnidahaya.

Filmography
His first film direction came through Agnidahaya in 2002. His most notable films include Guerrilla Marketing and Samanala Sandhawaniya.

Television
His first television serial is Weda Hamine, which later became a cult classic in Sri Lankan television drama history. His most notable television direction came through Dandubasnamanaya. His television serial, Akala Sandya is credited as the first ever Sri Lankan teledrama to depict the concept of time travel.

 Weda Hamine
 Dandubasnamanaya
 Akala Sandya
 Rajina
 Hathara Denek Senpathiyo
 Nannaththara 
 Wes Muhuna

Accolades
Sumathi Best Teledrama Director Award 1995 - Dandubasnamanaya
SIGNIS Salutation Award for Best Director 2003 - Agnidahaya.
Presidential Award for Best Director 2003 - Agnidahaya
Sumathi Best Teledrama Series Award 2009 - Hathara Denek Senpathiyo
Sumathi Best Teledrama Director Award 2009 - Hathara Denek Senpathiyo

References

External links
Orpheus and Eurydice in Sri Lanka
කළු කුමාරයා උද්දච්ඡ පුරුෂ රත්නයක්
Return of the warriors

Sri Lankan male film actors
Sinhalese male actors
1937 births
Sri Lankan film directors
Living people